Low blow may refer to:
 Low blow (combat sports), a groin attack
 
 Below the belt attack
 An unfair personal attack

Low Blow may refer to:

Low Blow (album), 1999 release by jazz musician Victor Bailey
NATO reporting name of the SA-3, fire control radar
Low Blows (podcast), a podcast centred around professional wrestling critique
Low Blows (album), a 2017 album by Meg Mac
"Low Blows" (song), a 2017 sing by Meg Mac
"Low Blow", song by Kylie Minogue from Golden
Low Blow (film), a 1986 film